The 2006 IIHF European Champions Cup was the second edition of IIHF European Champions Cup. It was held in Saint Petersburg at the Ice Palace arena, from January 5 to January 8. The champions of 2005 of the six strongest hockey nations of Europe participate: HC Dynamo Moscow (RUS), Frölunda HC (SWE), HC Slovan Bratislava (SVK), Kärpät (FIN), HC Moeller Pardubice (CZE), HC Davos (SUI).

Group A
Ivan Hlinka Division

Results
All times local (CET/UTC +1)

Standings

Group B
 Alexander Ragulin Division

Results
All times local (CET/UTC +1)

Standings

Gold medal game

External links
 Official site

1
1
IIHF European Champions Cup
2006